Eduard Halimi (born 8 December 1972) was Albania's Minister of Justice from 2011 until 2013 .

Early life and education
Halimi was born in Korca on 8 December 1972. He received a bachelor's degree in law at the University of Tirana in 1995. He has held the title 'Magistrate' since 2000. He also graduated from the Police Academy in 1997.

Career
Halimi worked as a lawyer until 2005. During this period, he also served as an expert to the parliamentary inquiry committees. In October 2005, he was named as the Deputy Minister of Justice. In 2007, he was also elected as a Member of the Municipal Council of Tirana. He was appointed the State General Advocate in 2008. He was elected as a member of the Assembly of the Republic of Albania for the Democratic Party of Albania in 2009. During his tenure, he was the Secretary of the Committee on Legal Affairs of the Albanian Parliament from 2009 to July 2011 . He was appointed Minister of Justice on 21 July 2011. Halimi is also a member of the Albanian High Council of Justice.

References

Living people
University of Tirana alumni
Democratic Party of Albania politicians
Government ministers of Albania
Justice ministers of Albania
20th-century Albanian lawyers
1972 births
People from Korçë
21st-century Albanian politicians
21st-century Albanian lawyers